The Ottawa Senators are a team in the National Hockey League that has played since 1992. 

Ottawa Senators can also refer to:

Politics
Since Ottawa is the seat of the federal government of Canada, it can also refer to the members
of the House of the Senate:

 Senate of Canada - the upper house of the Parliament of Canada

Hockey
 Ottawa Senators (CWHL) - current CWHL team
 Ottawa Jr. Senators - junior-level team, founded in 1980.
 Ottawa Senators (original) - History of Ottawa Hockey Club, senior-level team which played from 1883, and operated as the NHL Senators until 1934. (1883–1954).
 Ottawa Senators (senior hockey) - Second phase of Ottawa Hockey Club, senior-level amateur/semi-pro team, which won the Allan Cup in 1949. (1934–1954)
 Ottawa Senators (FHL) - professional team which played in 1908–09.

Other uses
 Ottawa Rough Riders - a Canadian football team that played under the name "Ottawa Senators" between 1925–1930.
 Ottawa Senators (baseball) - the name used by two different minor league baseball teams. The first played in the Canadian League from 1912–1915, while the second played in the Canadian–American League in 1936 before being renamed the Ottawa Braves in 1937.

See also

 
 
 Ottawa (disambiguation)
 Senators (disambiguation)
 Senator (disambiguation)